The 2011 Charlotte 49ers men's soccer team represented the University of North Carolina at Charlotte during the 2011 NCAA Division I men's soccer season.

The team reached the NCAA final, being the first team in the 49ers program history to reach a national championship. They ultimately lost to their sister university, UNC Chapel Hill 1–0 in the final.

Competitions 

Home team is listed on the right, and the away team is listed on the left.

Exhibitions

Regular season

Atlantic 10 standings

Results summary

Results by round

Game reports

A-10 Tournament

NCAA Tournament

College Cup

References 

Charlotte 49ers, Men
Charlotte 49ers
2011
Charlotte